Christopher Sykes may refer to:

 Christopher Sykes (author) (1907–1986), English author
 Christopher Sykes (politician) (1831–1898), English Conservative politician 
 Sir Christopher Sykes, 2nd Baronet (1749–1801), English Tory politician and MP for Beverley